William Williams (25 November 1844 – 12 March 1885) was an English first-class cricketer active 1862–78 who played for Nottinghamshire. He was born in Nottingham and died in Wandsworth. He played in fifteen first-class matches as a right-handed batsman, scoring 239 runs with a highest score of 31; as a right-arm roundarm fast bowler, taking three wickets with a best performance of two for 27.

References

1844 births
1885 deaths
English cricketers
Nottinghamshire cricketers
North v South cricketers
Non-international England cricketers
Gentlemen cricketers
Gentlemen of the North cricketers